N. Karupanna Odayar was elected to the Tamil Nadu Legislative Assembly from the Papanasam constituency in the 1996 elections. He was a candidate of the Tamil Maanila Congress (TMC) party. He died on 10 January 2022.

References 

20th-century births
2022 deaths
Tamil Nadu MLAs 1996–2001
Tamil Maanila Congress politicians
People from Thanjavur district
Year of birth missing